Ferdoos Mohammed (13 July 1906 in Egypt – 22 September 1961) was an Egyptian actress, famous for playing the role of a mother or a motherly figure lady in Egyptian films in the 1940s and 1950s.

Partial filmography
 Ibn El-balad
 Wakeful Eyes
 The Leech
Back Again
  Love and Adoration
 Ghazal Al Banat
 Sira` Fi al-Mina
 A Night of Love

References

External links

1906 births
1961 deaths
Egyptian film actresses
20th-century Egyptian actresses